Mark Andrew Guthrie (born September 22, 1965) is a former Major League Baseball relief pitcher who played for several teams between 1989 and 2003 and was a member of the 1991 World Series Champion Minnesota Twins.

Career
After graduating from Venice High School, Guthrie attended LSU where he led the team in ERA in 1985 and was all SEC first team in 1986. After the 1986 season, he played collegiate summer baseball with the Harwich Mariners of the Cape Cod Baseball League.

He was selected by the Twins in the 7th round of the 1987 amateur entry draft and played in Minnesota from 1989 to 1995. On November 6, 1996, he signed as a free agent with the Los Angeles Dodgers, where he played until the close of 1998. Following his membership with the Dodgers, Guthrie was a player for the Boston Red Sox, Chicago Cubs, Oakland Athletics, Toronto Blue Jays and the New York Mets. Throughout his entire professional career (1989–2003) Guthrie earned over $15 million. As a member of the Chicago Cubs in 2003, Guthrie took the loss in Game 1 of the 2003 National League Championship Series surrendering an 11th inning home run to the Marlins Mike Lowell.

Personal
His son, Dalton Guthrie, played college baseball at the University of Florida, was drafted in the sixth round of the 2017 MLB Draft by the Philadelphia Phillies, and made his major league debut in 2022 with the Phillies.

References

External links

1965 births
Living people
American expatriate baseball players in Canada
Baseball players from Buffalo, New York
Boston Red Sox players
Chicago Cubs players
Los Angeles Dodgers players
Louisiana State University alumni
Major League Baseball pitchers
Minnesota Twins players
New York Mets players
Oakland Athletics players
Orlando Twins players
Pawtucket Red Sox players
Portland Beavers players
Tampa Bay Devil Rays players
Toronto Blue Jays players
Visalia Oaks players
Harwich Mariners players